Karaitiana Takamoana (died 24 February 1879) was a prominent Māori chief of Ngāti Kahungunu, and a New Zealand Member of Parliament for the Eastern Maori electorate.

Recognised by many as a founding father of the modern Ngāti Kahungunu iwi, he was a veteran of the Musket Wars and the East Coast campaigns of the New Zealand Wars, including the East Cape War and Te Kooti's War.

He represented the Eastern Maori electorate from  until 1879, when he died.

Early life
Takamoana was said to have been born in Wairarapa to mother Te Rotohenga and father Tini-ki-runga. He was of the Ngāti Hawea hapu of Ngāti Kahungunu iwi. Takamoana derived chiefly rank among Ngati Te Whatu-i-apiti and Ngati Kahungunu in Heretaunga through his mother, Te Rotohenga, also known as Winipere. Henare Tomoana, also a prominent politician, was his half-brother.

Musket Wars
In the 1820s Takamoana fought at the battle of Te Roto-a-Tara against northern tribes. Around 1824, Takamoana was captured at Te Pakake pa and taken captive by Waikato forces who invaded the Mahia area, but was later released.

Political career
After an unsuccessful attempt in 1868, Takamoana entered Parliament in 1871 as member for Eastern Māori, succeeding Tareha Te Moananui. Takamoana held office until his death in 1879.

Later life
Karaitiana Takamoana is said to have had three wives in the 1870s, with some speculating he could have renounced his Christianity. When Takamoana died at Napier on 24 February 1879, he was said to be between 60 and 70 years old. He was buried at Pakowhai in a brick tomb opposite the site of his house.

References

Year of birth unknown
1879 deaths
New Zealand MPs for Māori electorates
Members of the New Zealand House of Representatives
19th-century New Zealand politicians
Ngāti Kahungunu people